Miao Qing (born 4 February 1983) is a Chinese male handball player who competed in the 2008 Summer Olympics.

References

1983 births
Living people
Chinese male handball players
Olympic handball players of China
Handball players at the 2008 Summer Olympics
Sportspeople from Tianjin
Handball players at the 2006 Asian Games
Handball players at the 2010 Asian Games
Asian Games competitors for China